Showajidaia sagamiensis is a species of sea slug, a dorid nudibranch, a shell-less marine gastropod mollusk in the family Showajidaiidae.

Distribution 
Known only from the central part of the Pacific coast of the Japanese island of Honshu, including Sagami Bay and Suruga Bay.

References 

Gastropods described in 1937
Fauna of Japan
Nudipleura
Nudibranchia